Cylindropuntia molesta is a cactus species that is endemic to Baja California state in Mexico.

It grows to a size of 2–8 feet in height x 2–5 feet in width.

Synonyms
 Cylindropuntia calmalliana (J.M.Coult.) F.M.Knuth
 Cylindropuntia molesta var. clavellina (Engelm. ex J.M.Coult.) Rebman
 Cylindropuntia molesta subsp. molesta
 Grusonia molesta (Brandegee) G.D.Rowley
 Opuntia calmalliana J.M. Coult.
 Opuntia molesta Brandegee

References
 Kaktus-ABC 126 1935.
 The Plant List entry
 Encyclopedia of Life entry
 IUCN Redlist entry
 Wheat Design Group entry

molesta
Cacti of Mexico
Endemic flora of Mexico
Flora of Baja California
Taxa named by Townshend Stith Brandegee